Green Oak may refer either to:

 Green oak, a type of timber used in wood-framed buildings
Green Oak, Indiana
Green Oak Township, Michigan

 

good wood